The Toppo Wassermann College (named for Count Francesco Toppo Wassermann) was a boarding school from 1900 until closing in the 1981–82 school year. It was located at  90 Via Gemona, Udine, Italy. The name Toppo Wassermann is now linked to, among other local institutions, a library, a primary school and the School of Excellence of the University of Udine.

Notable students
 Ardito Desio
 Primo Carnera 
 Udinese Calcio

Bibliography

External links
 Infosite 
 Un interno ricorda 
 Bollettino Ufficiale 15 June 2005 
 Le Collezioni di Toppo e suo ritratto  
 Inaugurazione anno Accademico, 2009-10 

Udine
Universities in Italy
Educational institutions established in 1900
1900 establishments in Italy